Bill Lomas (8 March 1928 – 14 August 2007) was an English Grand Prix motorcycle road racer. He was a two-time World Champion and a two-time Isle of Man TT winner. He won the 1955 and 1956 350cc world championship as a member of the Moto Guzzi factory racing team. In the 1956 season, he rode the famous V8 Moto Guzzi Grand Prix race bike. Lomas was also an accomplished trials rider.

He died in Mansfield, England on 14 August 2007 from complications following a heart attack.

Motorcycle Grand Prix results 

(Races in italics indicate fastest lap)

References

External links
 

English motorcycle racers
500cc World Championship riders
350cc World Championship riders
250cc World Championship riders
125cc World Championship riders
Isle of Man TT riders
1928 births
2007 deaths
350cc World Riders' Champions